The 2019 Weltklasse Zürich was an outdoor track and field meeting in Zürich, Switzerland. Held on 28–29 August 2019 at the Letzigrund, it was the thirteenth leg of the 2019 IAAF Diamond League – the highest level international track and field circuit – and the first half of the final for 2019 (the second half being held during the Memorial Van Damme in Brussels, Belgium on 6 September). It was the tenth and last edition of the meet to co-host the Diamond League final with the Memorial Van Damme; The Weltklasse Zürich will exclusively host the final in 2020.

Because of the late World Athletics Championships, the Diamond League final was for the first time held before the World Athletics Championships. Sixteen Diamond League champions (eight men and eight women) were determined and received wildcards to compete at the 2019 World Athletics Championships. Thirteen more events were contested outside the Diamond League.

Diamond League champions

Diamond League results

Men

Women

Non-Diamond League results

Men

Women

Mixed boys and girls

See also
2019 Meeting de Paris (previous Diamond League meet)
2019 Memorial Van Damme (next Diamond League meet)

References

Results
Results Weltklasse Zürich. IAAF Diamond League (29 August 2019). Retrieved 19 February 2020.

External links
Official Diamond League Weltklasse Zürich website

2019
Weltklasse Zürich
Weltklasse Zürich